Kiongwe is a settlement in Kenya's Coast Province. Lying on the shore of the Indian Ocean it serves as the popular coastal tourism centre. The settlement has a population of 845 as per the 2015 census.

Kiongwe is one of Kenya's oldest continually inhabited settlements, and was one of the original Swahili settlements along coastal East Africa. Kiongwe is a popular resort because of its marvelous Indian Ocean beaches, wildlife and at same time it is a destination for backpackers in search of an 'authentic' experience.

Geography and climate 
Being a coastal settlement, Kiongwe is characterised by a flat topography.

Kiongwe has a warm, tropical climate.  The amount of rainfall depends essentially on season. The rainiest months are April and May, while in January to February the rainfall is minimal.

External links 
 Kenya profile

Populated places in Coast Province
Tourism in Kenya
Archaeological sites in Kenya